Alexandre Ramos Samuel (born March 20, 1970), nickname Tande, is a former Brazilian volleyball player. He began playing volleyball for the Botafogo team, when he was 12 years old.

His first major achievement was as a gold medal from the 1992 Summer Olympics in Barcelona. In 1995, he played with the Brazilian team and got the fifth place at the 1996 Summer Olympics in Atlanta. In 1997 he switched to beach volleyball, to play with his former teammate, Giovane Gavio. By 1999, was awarded as "the king of the beach".

References

External links
 
 
 
 
 

1970 births
Brazilian men's volleyball players
Living people
Volleyball players at the 1992 Summer Olympics
Volleyball players at the 1996 Summer Olympics
Volleyball players at the 2000 Summer Olympics
Olympic volleyball players of Brazil
Olympic gold medalists for Brazil
Olympic medalists in volleyball
Medalists at the 1992 Summer Olympics
People from Resende
Sportspeople from Rio de Janeiro (state)
Pan American Games medalists in volleyball
Pan American Games silver medalists for Brazil
Medalists at the 1991 Pan American Games